Crossing Over is a 2009 American crime drama film written and directed by Wayne Kramer. It follows illegal immigrants of different nationalities struggling to achieve legal status in Los Angeles: dealing with the border, document fraud and extortion, the asylum and green card process, work-site enforcement, naturalization, the office of counter-terrorism, and the clash of cultures. The film is based on Kramer's similarly titled 1995 short film. He produced the film alongside Frank Marshall.

Plot

After immigrant Mireya Sanchez is deported, ICE / Homeland Security Investigations Special Agent Max Brogan takes care of her little son and brings him to the boy's grandparents in Mexico. Later the woman is found dead near the border. Brogan returns to the grandparents to tell them the bad news.

Taslima Jahangir, a 15-year-old girl from Bangladesh, presents a paper at school promoting that people should try to understand the 9/11 hijackers. The school principal reports this to authorities. FBI agents raid the home and ransack the girl's room, reading her diaries and a school assignment on the ethics of suicide; they criticize her room as "too austere" and note that she has an account on an Islamic website. The profiler says this makes her look like a would-be suicide bomber. Taslima is not charged for this, but it turns out that she stays in the United States illegally. She was born in Bangladesh and brought to the United States at age three. Taslima's continued presence jeopardizes her chances and puts at risk her two younger siblings, who are US citizens because they were born in the country. Denise Frankel, the immigration defense attorney, suggests that instead of the whole family's being deported, Taslima can leave for Bangladesh with her mother while the rest of the family stays in the U.S.

Cole Frankel, an immigration examiner/officer, gets into a car accident with Claire Shepard, an aspiring actress from Australia. Realizing that she is in the country illegally, Cole makes an arrangement with Claire whereby she will have unlimited sex with him for two months in exchange for a green card. When Cole eventually says he wants to leave his wife for Claire, she makes it clear that she holds him in contempt and is only sleeping with him for the green card. In a moment of clarity, Cole exempts Claire from completing the two months and arranges for her to get her green card in the mail. Special Agents from the ICE / Office of Inspector General eventually confront Claire about the suspiciousness in her immigration paperwork, and she admits to the sexual arrangement she had with Cole and leaves the country "voluntarily". Cole is arrested by ICE/OIG for corruption. His wife Denise Frankel adopts a little girl from Nigeria, who has already been in the detention center for 23 months.

Brogan has a colleague, Hamid Baraheri. His sister, Zahra, is having sex with a married man, Javier Pedroza. The Baraheri family does not approve. Hamid's brother Farid plans to scare the couple, but things get out of hand: he shoots both of them, and goes to Hamid, who helps him hide the evidence. Brogan slowly suspects Hamid's involvement as the film progresses.

Javier Pedroza worked in a copy shop and made extra money by providing counterfeit immigration papers. Claire had previously paid him for false papers before she had made her arrangement with Cole. But when Javier was killed, the authorities discovered her documents among his belongings, leading the immigration team to examine Claire's case more closely.

South Korean teenager Yong Kim is about to be naturalized with the rest of his family, but he has started to hang out with a bad crowd and ultimately participates in a convenience store robbery to "pop his cherry" with his gang. Hamid happens to be at the same convenience store and kills the other robbers but (due to his own guilt over his involvement in his sister's death) lets Yong Kim go free.

Gavin Kossef, Claire's boyfriend and an atheist Jewish musician from the United Kingdom, pretends to be a religious Jew in order to get a job at a Jewish school, which allows him to stay in the U.S. When reporting to an immigration office, the immigration examiner/officer makes him demonstrate his familiarity with the Jewish religion in front of a rabbi visiting for other purposes – Kossef chants poorly but the rabbi gives his approval. After the test, in private, the rabbi requires Kossef to bring his "wonderful" voice to temple and to take lessons from him to eliminate the deficiencies in his knowledge.

Brogan investigates the murder of Zahra Baraheri and her boyfriend.  He finds proof of Farid's guilt in the murders and Hamid's guilt in the cover-up.  Disgusted by the brothers' actions he turns the evidence over to the Los Angeles Police Department.  The LAPD arrests Farid for two counts of murder and Hamid as an accessory to two murders after the fact.

Cast
 Harrison Ford as ICE Special Agent Max Brogan
 Ray Liotta as Cole Frankel
 Ashley Judd as Denise Frankel
 Jim Sturgess as Gavin Kossef
 Cliff Curtis as ICE Special Agent Hamid Baraheri
 Alice Braga as Mireya Sánchez
 Marshall Manesh as Sangar Baraheri
 Alice Eve as Claire Shephard
 Justin Chon as Yong Kim
 Summer Bishil as Taslima Jahangir
 Melody Khazae as Zahra Baraheri
 Jacqueline Obradors as FBI Special Agent Marina Phadkar
Naila Azad Nupur as Rokeya Jahangir

Production
Crossing Over was filmed on location in Los Angeles in 2007.

The film originally featured a scene in which an Iranian woman is murdered by her brother in an honor killing. Following complaints that the plotline was unrealistic and offensive, the killing was presented as an intended beating which got out of hand, removing the dialogue referring to "honor" and "family honor".

Additionally, Sean Penn filmed scenes as an immigration cop. However, his scenes were cut due to the controversy over the honor killing plot, though producer Harvey Weinstein later claimed that Penn's agent requested his scenes be cut out of the film.

Release
Although the film was shot in 2007, it was not released until 2009, and even then only in a limited theatrical run. The film's original running length was 140 minutes, but the film's producer (who had final cut privilege) was convinced to edit the film down to 113 minutes when Harvey Weinstein threatened to release the film straight to DVD and bypass a theatrical release altogether. In many countries outside of the US, the film went straight to DVD anyway.

The film was distributed in the United States by MGM and The Weinstein Company. It was given a limited theatrical release on February 27, 2009, and ultimately grossed less than US$500,000 in North America, and just over US$2.5 million internationally. The film has reportedly made another US$1.7 million in U.S. DVD sales.

Reception
The film received generally negative reviews. Review aggregator site Rotten Tomatoes reports that 16% of 106 critics gave the film a positive review, for an average rating of 4.1/10. The site's consensus reads that: "Crossing Over is flagrant and heavy-handed about a situation that deserves more deliberate treatment, and joins its characters with coincidences that strain believability". Metacritic, which assigns a weighted average score out of 100 to reviews from mainstream critics, gives the film a score of 38 based on reviews from 31 critics indicating "generally unfavorable reviews".

References

External links
 
 
 
 
 

2009 films
2009 crime drama films
American crime drama films
Films about the Federal Bureau of Investigation
Films produced by Frank Marshall
Films set in Los Angeles
Films set in Mexico
Films shot in Los Angeles
Films about illegal immigration to the United States
The Kennedy/Marshall Company films
The Weinstein Company films
Films scored by Mark Isham
Films directed by Wayne Kramer (filmmaker)
2000s English-language films
2000s American films